Lux Mundi  (Latin for "Light of the World") is a  tall statue of Jesus at Solid Rock Church, a Christian nondenominational church near Monroe, Ohio, in the United States.  Designed by Tom Tsuchiya, Lux Mundi replaced the statue King of Kings which was struck by lightning and destroyed by fire in 2010.

Design

The statue shows Jesus stepping forward with a welcoming gesture, a pose inspired by the Gospels of St. Matthew and St. John. Facing I-75, the statue stands on a foundation decorated by rocks with a cascading water feature. 

Because of its pose and inviting quality (and in reference to its predecessor's nickname "Touchdown Jesus"), Lux Mundi has earned the nickname “Hug Me Jesus”.

Construction

The polymer composite and steel sculpture is mainly fabricated by Display Dynamics of Clayton, Ohio. Since the original statue at Solid Rock Church was destroyed by fire, the new statue incorporates fire resistant materials including a lightning suppression system. Following several months of work, the major pieces of the statue were assembled together at the site on September 19, 2012, and it was dedicated eleven days later.

See also
 List of statues of Jesus
 List of tallest statues
 List of the tallest statues in the United States

References

External links

Buildings and structures in Warren County, Ohio
Colossal statues of Jesus
Monuments and memorials in Ohio
Outdoor sculptures in Ohio
Christianity in Ohio
2012 sculptures